Acosmeryx castanea is a moth of the family Sphingidae. It was described by Rothschild and Jordan in 1903.

Distribution 
Is known from eastern and southern China, Taiwan, South Korea and Japan.

Description 
The wingspan is 75–90 mm.

Biology 
In Hong Kong, adults are on wing from March to late September. In Korea and Japan, adults are on wing from late June to mid-August. There are multiple generations per year.

The larvae feed on Ampelopsis glandulosa and Cayratia japonica.

References

Acosmeryx
Moths described in 1903
Moths of Asia